Wolffia australiana is a species of flowering plant in the subfamily Lemnaceae within the family Araceae.

References

Lemnoideae
Plants described in 1972